Among the Suns is the debut English-language studio album by the Latvian pop/rock music group Brainstorm, released in May 1999 and reissue in July 2000, which was issued in the same year with the Latvian-language album Starp divām saulēm in the same title (1999), with the English version, well as their Latvian album Viss ir tieši tā kā tu vēlies. The album includes the songs featuring the English version of Under My Wing, Welcome To My Country was represented in the music video. The album was recorded at Denmark and Sweden and reached #13 the charts in Finland for over 15 weeks, number 42 in Belgium for two weeks and number 47 in Sweden for four weeks which became a minor-charting album. On July 14, 2000 the album was reissued which included a song My Star represented Latvia at the Eurovision Song Contest 2000. It sold more than 80,000 copies in Europe

Track listing 

All songs written by Renārs Kaupers except "My Star" written by Brainstorm

Personnel 
 Renārs Kaupers - vocals, guitar
 Jānis Jubalts - guitar
 Māris Mihelsons - keyboards, accordion
 Kaspars Roga - drums
 Gundars Mauševics - bass

Charts 

Singles

Release history

References 

1999 debut albums
Brainstorm (Latvian band) albums